The list of shipwrecks in 1960 includes all ships sunk, foundered, grounded, or otherwise lost during 1960.

January

1 January

6 January

9 January

10 January

13 January

14 January

18 January

20 January

30 January

31 January

February

3 February

13 February

18 February

20 February

21 February

26 February

27 February

March

1 March

4 March

8 March

13 March

14 March

15 March

17 March

21 March

26 March

27 March

28 March

Unknown date

April

4 April

10 April

11 April

13 April

16 April

17 April

22 April

29 April

May

5 May

8 May

11 May

18 May

21 May

25 May

June

1 June

9 June

13 June

14 June

18 June

19 June

24 June

26 June

29 June

July

7 July

11 July

13 July

18 July

19 July

24 July

August

2 August

4 August

5 August

6 August

8 August

24 August

2 August

September

2 September

3 September

7 September

8 September

14 September

17 September

29 September

Unknown date

October

2 October

4 October

7 October

8 October

11 October

22 October

24 October

25 October

26 October

31 October

Unknown date

November

6 November

9 November

15 November

28 November

29 November

Unknown date

December

1 December

6 December

7 December

8 December

12 December

14 December

16 December

21 December

28 December

30 December

31 December

Unknown date

References

See also

1960
 
Ships